PKA may refer to:

 Professionally known as:
 Pen name
 Stage persona
 pKa, the symbol for the acid dissociation constant at logarithmic scale 
 Protein kinase A, a class of cAMP-dependent enzymes
 Pi Kappa Alpha, the North-American social fraternity
 Public key authentication, establishing key authenticity in public-key cryptography 
 Professional Karate Association
 Primary knock-on atom, an atom that is displaced from its lattice site by irradiation
Painkiller Already, a podcast featuring FPSRussia
Pentax KA-mount, a camera lens mount

Non-Latin 
The Latin letters PKA are visually similar to the Cyrillic acronym , the Russian Federal Space Agency